Anthony Buencamino (born November 28, 1966), professionally known as Nonie Buencamino, is a Filipino character actor known for his theater work. He is strongly associated with Philippine New Wave Cinema, playing roles such as Mayor Bartolome in Jun Lana's Barber's Tales and Felipe Buencamino in Jerrold Tarog's Heneral Luna.

Personal life
He is the son of seminal Kundiman composer Francisco Beltran Buencamino Sr. and the brother of composer Nonong Buencamino. He is a descendant of Felipe Buencamino. He married actress Shamaine Centenera-Buencamino, and the couple had four children, including actresses Delphine and the late Julia Buencamino.

Filmography

Film

Television

References

External links

1966 births
Living people
20th-century Filipino male actors
Filipino male comedians
Filipino male film actors
Filipino people of Mexican descent
GMA Network personalities
ABS-CBN personalities
Ateneo de Manila University alumni
Place of birth missing (living people)